Mangalgad, also known as Kangori, is a fort in Maharashtra near the village of Dudhanewadi.

How to reach
It takes about 2 hours trekking time to reach the fort from the base village Dudhanewadi.

History
Mangalgad was built by Chandrarao More of Jawli. It was one of seven forts captured by Shivaji in 1648. It was the place of confinement of Chitursing the brother of the Raja of Satara, from 1812 till his death in 1818. In 1817 Cornets Hunter and Morrison, two English officers on the Madras establishment, on their way from Hyderabad to Poona with a small escort were caught at Uruli twenty miles east of Poona, and imprisoned here. Some time after, by Gokhla's orders, they were removed to Vasota in Satara, and, on the destruction of that fort in April 1817, they were restored to freedom. In 1818 Kangori was taken by Colonel Prother, after the fall of Raigad fort.

Places to see
The buildings and the gateway are in ruins but a part of the rampart remains. Within the rampart is a ruined temple and a rock-cut cistern, but no building of any size or interest. Mangalgad consists of a single temple, called Kangori Devi Temple, with cisterns at the top. The wada and prison are both in ruins.

References

See also 

 List of forts in Maharashtra
 List of forts in India
 Baji Prabhu Deshpande
 Marathi People
 Maratha Navy
 List of Maratha dynasties and states
 Maratha War of Independence
 Battles involving the Maratha Empire
 Maratha Army
 Maratha titles
 Military history of India
 List of people involved in the Maratha Empire

Buildings and structures of the Maratha Empire
Forts in Raigad district
Forts in Maharashtra
16th-century forts in India
Tourist attractions in Raigad district
Indian rock-cut architecture
Former populated places in India
Hiking trails in India

Hiking